Guangzhou Sport University is a provincial public university based in Guangzhou, Guangdong, China. On June 9, 1956, the Guangzhou Sport University was established with the approval of the Guangzhou Municipal Government of Guangdong Province.

History 
The university was formerly known as Guangzhou Physical Education Institute.

References

External links 
Guangzhou Sport University

Universities and colleges in Guangzhou
Sports universities and colleges in China